Alessandro Ruggeri (born November 16, 1990) is an Italian professional football player who last played for Cuneo.

External links
 
 

1990 births
Living people
Italian footballers
A.S.D. Victor San Marino players
Reggina 1914 players
A.C. Cuneo 1905 players
Piacenza Calcio 1919 players
Serie B players
Association football defenders